Bryan Saltus (born February 26, 1971) is an American professional golfer.

Saltus began playing golf aged ten, and turned professional in 1996 at the relatively late age of 25. In 2004 he joined the Asian Tour and quickly established himself as a top player. He had his highest Order of Merit finish in 2006, at 24th, and the following year won his first tournament at the inaugural Johnnie Walker Cambodian Open. However, after that Saltus' form declined, and he lost his tour card at the end of 2009.

Professional wins (1)

Asian Tour wins (1)

External links

American male golfers
Asian Tour golfers
Golfers from California
People from Costa Mesa, California
1971 births
Living people